Peter J. Glick Jr. (1922 – September 1986) was an author and an American football player and coach. He served as the head football coach at Delaware Valley University 1950.

References

External links
 Delaware Valley University memorial faculty profile

1922 births
1986 deaths
Delaware Valley Aggies football coaches
Delaware Valley University faculty
Princeton Tigers football players
Princeton Tigers men's lacrosse players
TCNJ Lions football coaches
Sportspeople from Pittsburgh
Players of American football from Pittsburgh